Leoni Leo (subtitled The Life of an Armenian Adventurer) is a 1917 Hungarian adventure film directed by Alfréd Deésy and featuring Béla Lugosi. It is thought to be Bela Lugosi's first appearance in a motion picture (credited as "Arisztid Olt"). The Jozsef Pakots screenplay was adapted from the original novel by George Sand called Leone Leoni. The original novel was set in Venice, but the film changed the setting to Brussels. The sets were designed by Sironthai Istvan.

Plot
Lugosi plays the noble bandit Baron Leone Leo, who leads a group of roguish gentlemen known as "the Ten". He tricks Juliette, whose father is the richest jeweler in Brussels, into thinking he is in love with her, but he is really just after her for her money.

Cast
 Norbert Dán
 Béla Lugosi as Leoni Leo (credited as Arisztid Olt)
 Annie Góth as Juliette
 Lilla Bársony as Princess Zagarolo
 Róbert Fiáth as Marquis Lorenzo
 Lajos Gellért as Róbert (credited as Viktor Kurd)
 Marel Rolla as Carmen
 Gusztáv Turán as Mario
 Klara Pet
 Loth Ila
 Richard Kornay

See also
 Béla Lugosi filmography

References

External links

1917 films
1917 adventure films
Hungarian black-and-white films
Hungarian silent films
Films directed by Alfréd Deésy
Austro-Hungarian films
Films based on French novels
Films based on works by George Sand